Philippe Lioret (born 10 October 1955) is a French film director, screenwriter and producer.

Filmography

References

External links

 

1955 births
Living people
Officiers of the Ordre des Arts et des Lettres
Film directors from Paris
French screenwriters
French film producers